Sabine Oberhauser (30 August 1963 – 23 February 2017) was an Austrian physician and politician. At the time of her death, she was Austria's Minister for Health and Minister for Women.

Biography 
Oberhauser was born in Vienna. In 2014, she became a minister in the Social Democrat-Christian Conservative coalition government of then-Chancellor Werner Faymann. She continued as Minister for Health when Christian Kern took over the coalition two years later. The same year, she became the Minister for Women. She made her diagnosis of abdominal cancer public in 2015.

Oberhauser was married and had two daughters.

Oberhauser entered hospital in February 2017 for treatment of a ventricular fuse, and announced on 15 February that Alois Stöger would stand in for her during her illness. However, her condition soon deteriorated and she died a week later, on 23 February 2017. She was 53. She was cremated at Feuerhalle Simmering; her ashes are buried in Hietzing Cemetery in Vienna.

References

1963 births
2017 deaths
Politicians from Vienna
Social Democratic Party of Austria politicians
Women government ministers of Austria
Austrian women physicians
20th-century Austrian physicians
21st-century Austrian physicians
20th-century women physicians
21st-century women physicians
21st-century Austrian women politicians
21st-century Austrian politicians